Martin Joseph Fettman (B.S., D.V.M., M.S., Ph.D., Diplomate, ACVP) is an American pathologist and researcher who flew on NASA Space Shuttle mission STS-58 aboard the Space Shuttle Columbia as a Payload Specialist.

Personal data
Born December 31, 1956, Brooklyn, New York. Married to Heather Connally DVM MS DACVECC. Recreational interests include scuba diving, amateur radio, flying, bicycling, pistol marksmanship, camping and mountain hiking, photography, travel, reading (mysteries), and music (jazz and classical). His mother, Mrs. Elaine Fettman Peck, resides in Brooklyn, New York, with his stepfather, Mr. Harold Peck. His father, Mr. Bernard P. Fettman, is deceased.

Education
 1973: Graduated from Midwood High School, Brooklyn, New York
 1976: Received bachelor of science degree in animal nutrition from Cornell University
 1980: Received a doctor of veterinary medicine degree and master of science degree in nutrition from Cornell University
 1982: Received a doctor of philosophy degree in physiology from Colorado State University
 1984: Received board certification in veterinary clinical pathology
 Diplomate of the American College of Veterinary Pathologists

Organizations
 American Academy of Veterinary Nutrition
 American Association for Clinical Chemistry
 American Association for the Advancement of Science
 American College of Veterinary Pathologists
 American Dairy Science Association
 American Society of Animal Science
 American Society of Gravitational and Space Biology
 American Veterinary Medical Association
 Association of Veterinarians for Animal Rights
 New York Academy of Sciences
 Shock Society
 National Audubon Society (life)
 National Wildlife Federation (life)
 Nature Conservancy
 Sierra Club

Publications
He has published over 100 research articles in refereed scientific journals.

Experience
Fettman's first faculty appointment was 1982–1986 in the Department of Pathology of the College of Veterinary Medicine and Biomedical Sciences at Colorado State University, as an Assistant Professor of Clinical Pathology whose duties included teaching, research, and clinical service. From 1983 to the present, he has held a joint appointment in the Department of Physiology at Colorado State University and his research and teaching interests have focused on selected aspects of the Pathophysiology of nutritional and metabolic diseases, with emphasis on the physiological biochemistry of energy, electrolyte, and fluid metabolism. In 1986 he was promoted to Associate Professor, and in 1988 assumed the duties of section chief of Clinical Pathology in the Veterinary Teaching Hospital at Colorado State University. Fettman spent one year (1989–1990) on sabbatical leave as a Visiting Professor of Medicine at The Queen Elizabeth Hospital and the University of Adelaide, South Australia, where he worked with the Gastroenterology Unit studying the biochemical epidemiology of human colorectal cancer. He was appointed to the Mark L. Morris Chair in Clinical Nutrition at Colorado State University and received a joint appointment in the Department of Clinical Sciences in 1991, and was promoted to Full Professor of Pathology in 1992. Fettman is a George H. Glover distinguished faculty member of the College of Veterinary Medicine and Biomedical Sciences and was named the 1994 Sigma Xi honored scientist at Colorado State University, the 1994 Spencer T. and Ann W. Olin Lecturer at Cornell University, and a Bard College Distinguished Scientist for 1995.

Spaceflight
Fettman was selected as a NASA payload specialist candidate in December 1991, as the prime payload specialist for Spacelab Life Sciences-2 in October 1992. He then flew on STS-58 in October 1993. Since the flight, he has made over seventy public appearances representing space life sciences research before higher education, medical, veterinary, and lay organizations, and visited over twenty K-12 schools around the United States and Canada. He is a member of the NASA Advisory Council Life and Biomedical Sciences and Applications Advisory Subcommittee.

References

External links

Spacefacts biography of Martin J. Fettman

1956 births
Living people
Amateur radio people
American astronauts
20th-century American Jews
American veterinarians
Male veterinarians
Scientists from Brooklyn
Midwood High School alumni
Colorado State University alumni
NASA sponsored astronauts
Cornell University College of Agriculture and Life Sciences alumni
Cornell University College of Human Ecology alumni
Cornell University College of Veterinary Medicine alumni
Space Shuttle program astronauts
21st-century American Jews